Hoffman & Associates (formerly PN Hoffman & Associates) is a privately-held real estate development company based in Washington D.C. most known for mixed-use and urban developments. The company has completed approximately seventy developments in the Washington D.C. area, including The Wharf development on D.C.'s Southwest Waterfront. The company's headquarters are in Washington D.C., with a second office in Raleigh, North Carolina.

History
Hoffman & Associates was founded in 1993 as PN Hoffman by current CEO Monty Hoffman and former partner Pete Nazelrod. The company initially produced luxury condos in the D.C. area and incorporated green and sustainable practices into designs. The Alta at Thomas Circle, completed in 2006, was the first LEED-certified residential building in Washington D.C.

Southwest Waterfront Development

In September 2006, the company was selected to develop the portion of the District's Southwest Waterfront now known as The Wharf. Hoffman ultimately partnered with Madison Marquette to build The Wharf and the first phase of the development opened in October 2017. The Wharf is operated by Hoffman-Madison Waterfront, a joint venture between Hoffman & Associates and Madison Marquette. The second phase of the project is projected to be complete in 2022 and will cover nearly one mile of the waterfront and contain more than 3 million square feet of mixed use space. The total cost of the development is estimated to be $2.5 billion.

As part of the project to redevelop the Southwest Waterfront, Hoffman also redeveloped the historic Riverside Baptist Church and St. Augustine's Church in Southwest D.C.

Additional D.C. Development

In 2014, the company was chosen to build a residential building at The Yards, the 42-acre development on D.C.'s Anacostia River waterfront. The Bower was the first for-sale condominium in The Yards.

In May 2019, the company entered into a partnership with EYA, and Regency Centers to develop a 9.4-acre section of Falls Church, Virginia into mixed-use development.  Initially dubbed Little City Commons, the project was later designated as West Falls to better integrate with surrounding developments. The project experienced a slowdown during the 2020 Covid-19 pandemic and ground breaking was planned for sometime in 2021.  The site is expected to include 1.4 million square feet of mixed use space and a 99-year lease on the property is expected to bring the city of Falls Church as much as $44.5 million.

Expansion

In Dec. of 2018, the company acquired Seaboard Station in downtown Raleigh, North Carolina and is planning a redevelopment of the space valued at $300 million. and will open in 2022.  In 2019, Hoffman & Associates was selected as the development partner for GoTriangle's Raleigh Union Station Bus Facility project.

Awards

References 

Real estate and property developers